La Torre de Cabdella or La Torre de Capdella is a village in the province of Lleida and autonomous community of Catalonia, Spain.

See also
Cabdella Lakes

References

External links
 
 Government data pages 

Municipalities in Pallars Jussà